Peter II may refer to:

Politics
 Pope Peter II of Alexandria (ruled 373–381)
 Peter (II) Delyan of Bulgaria (reigned 1040–1041), leader of the Macedonian uprising against the Byzantine Empire
 Peter IV of Bulgaria or Peter II, Emperor of Bulgaria 1185–1197
 Peter II of Aragon (1174–1213), King of Aragon and Count of Barcelona
 Peter II of Courtenay (died 1219)
 Peter II, Count of Savoy (1203–1268), called the Little Charlemagne
 Peter II of Sicily (1304-1342)
 Peter II of Cyprus (c. 1357–1382), called The Fat
 Peter II, Duke of Brittany (1418–1457), count of Montfort and titular earl of Richmond
 Peter II, Duke of Bourbon (1438–1503)
 Peter II of Portugal (1648–1706), King of Portugal and the Algarves
 Peter II of Russia (1715–1730)
 Peter II of Montenegro (1813–1851)
 Peter II of Brazil (1825–1891), second and last Emperor of Brazil
 Peter II of Yugoslavia (1923–1970)

Religion
 Pope Peter II of Alexandria, 21st Patriarch of Alexandria from 373 to 381 AD
 Manuel Corral (1934–2011), Pope of the Palmarian Catholic Church as Peter II from 2005 to 2011

See also
Pedro II (disambiguation)
Pope Peter II (disambiguation)